Sphingopyxis bauzanensis is a bacterium. It is Gram-negative, aerobic and psychrophilic. The type strain is BZ30T (=5DSM 22271T =5CGMCC 1.8959T =5CIP 110136T).

References

External links 
LPSN
Type strain of Sphingopyxis bauzanensis at BacDive -  the Bacterial Diversity Metadatabase

Sphingomonadales
Bacteria described in 2010